Fromanvirus (synonyms L5-like viruses, L5-like phages, L5likevirus) is a genus of viruses in the order Caudovirales, in the family Siphoviridae. Bacteria serve as natural hosts, with transmission achieved through passive diffusion. There are 59 species in this genus.

Taxonomy
The following species are recognized:

 Mycobacterium virus Alma
 Mycobacterium virus Arturo
 Mycobacterium virus Astro
 Mycobacterium virus Backyardigan
 Mycobacterium virus Benedict
 Mycobacterium virus Bethlehem
 Mycobacterium virus Billknuckles
 Mycobacterium virus BPBiebs31
 Mycobacterium virus Bruns
 Mycobacterium virus Bxb1
 Mycobacterium virus Bxz2
 Mycobacterium virus Che12
 Mycobacterium virus Cuco
 Mycobacterium virus D29
 Mycobacterium virus Doom
 Mycobacterium virus Ericb
 Mycobacterium virus Euphoria
 Mycobacterium virus George
 Mycobacterium virus Gladiator
 Mycobacterium virus Goose
 Mycobacterium virus Hammer
 Mycobacterium virus Heldan
 Mycobacterium virus Jasper
 Mycobacterium virus JC27
 Mycobacterium virus Jeffabunny
 Mycobacterium virus JHC117
 Mycobacterium virus KBG
 Mycobacterium virus Kssjeb
 Mycobacterium virus Kugel
 Mycobacterium virus L5
 Mycobacterium virus Lesedi
 Mycobacterium virus LHTSCC
 Mycobacterium virus lockley
 Mycobacterium virus Marcell
 Mycobacterium virus Microwolf
 Mycobacterium virus Mrgordo
 Mycobacterium virus Museum
 Mycobacterium virus Nepal
 Mycobacterium virus Packman
 Mycobacterium virus Peaches
 Mycobacterium virus Perseus
 Mycobacterium virus Pukovnik
 Mycobacterium virus Rebeuca
 Mycobacterium virus Redrock
 Mycobacterium virus Ridgecb
 Mycobacterium virus Rockstar
 Mycobacterium virus Saintus
 Mycobacterium virus Skipole
 Mycobacterium virus Solon
 Mycobacterium virus Switzer
 Mycobacterium virus SWU1
 Mycobacterium virus Tiger
 Mycobacterium virus Timshel
 Mycobacterium virus Trixie
 Mycobacterium virus Turbido
 Mycobacterium virus Twister
 Mycobacterium virus U2
 Mycobacterium virus Violet
 Mycobacterium virus Wonder

Structure
Fromanviruses are nonenveloped, with a head and tail. The icosahedral head is about 60 nm in diameter, with covalently linked capsid proteins. The tail is long and flexible, at about 135 nm long, 8 nm wide, and has a terminal knob with one short tail fiber.

Genome
Bxb1, D29, and L5 and have been fully sequenced. They range between 49k and 53k nucleotides, with 79 to 90 proteins. Their complete genomes, and the genomes of many other species and unclassified viruses, are available via NCBI.

Life cycle
The virus attaches to the host cell's adhesion receptors using its terminal fiber, and ejects the viral DNA into the host cytoplasm via long flexible tail ejection system. Viral replication is cytoplasmic. Replication follows the replicative transposition model. DNA-templated transcription is the method of transcription. Once the viral genes have been replicated, the procapsid is assembled and packed. The tail is then assembled and the mature virions are released via lysis. Bacteria serve as the natural host. Transmission routes are passive diffusion.

History
According to ICTV's 1996 report, the genus L5likevirus was first accepted under the name L5-like phages, assigned only to family Siphoviridae. The whole family was moved to the newly created order Caudovirales in 1998, and the genus was renamed to L5-like viruses in ICTV's seventh report in 1999. In 2012, the genus was renamed again, this time to L5likevirus. The genus was later renamed to Fromanvirus.

References

External links
 Viralzone: L5likevirus
 ICTV

Siphoviridae
Virus genera